This is a list of episodes for the early 1990s television series Dinosaurs.

Series overview

Episodes

Season 1 (1991)

Season 2 (1991–92)

Season 3 (1992–93)

Season 4 (1994–95)

Season 4 was divided into two parts: A Summer series of new episodes written to serve as a coda to the series, culminating in Changing Nature, a definitive finale that sees the dinosaurs witness the dawn of the ice age; and a second, Fall series consisting of older episodes that had been preempted and never allowed to run. As a result, the last episodes aired take place chronologically before the series finale, which implies the deaths of the show's main characters. In syndication, networks tend to air the episodes in chronological rather than production order.

References

External links

 
 

Lists of American sitcom episodes